Movileni may refer to several places in Romania:

 Movileni, Iași, a commune in Iași County
 Movileni, Olt, a commune in Olt County
 Movileni, a village in Concești Commune, Botoșani County
 Movileni, a village in Șendreni Commune, Galați County
 Movileni, a village in Tecuci Commune, Galați County
 Movileni, a village in Heleșteni Commune, Iași County
 Movileni, a village in Vadu Moldovei Commune, Suceava County
 Movileni, a village in Coroiești Commune, Vaslui County

and to:

Movileni, a village in Cuhnești Commune, Glodeni district, Moldova

See also 
 Movila (disambiguation)
 Movilă (surname)
 Movilița (disambiguation)